The Australian Marine Conservation Society (AMCS) is an Australian environmental not-for-profit organisation. It was founded in 1965 as the Queensland Littoral Society before changing its name to the Australian Littoral Society and then finally in 1995 to its current title. It works on protecting the health and vitality of Australia's coasts and oceans.

The Australian Marine Conservation Society is Australia's only national charity dedicated exclusively to protecting ocean wildlife and their homes.

The Australian Marine Conservation Society is an independent charity, staffed by a committed group of professional and passionate scientists, educators and advocates who have defended Australia's oceans for fifty years.

The Patron of the Australian Marine Conservation Society is author Tim Winton.

Campaigns 
The key focus of AMCS is to create large marine national parks (marine sanctuaries), sustainable fisheries and protect and recover our threatened ocean wildlife, such as our sharks, seals and whales. AMCS also works to protect Australia's coasts from inappropriate development, including along the Great Barrier Reef.

Fight For Our Reef 
AMCS has worked to protect the Great Barrier Reef for many years from threats such as industrialisation, port development, coral mining and dumping. Today, AMCS focuses on saving the Great Barrier Reef from climate change after two mass coral bleaching events affected half of all shallow water corals in 2016 and 2017. The AMPTO and tourism operators in North Queensland work with AMCS to represent the voices of tourism employees and their reliance on a healthy Great Barrier Reef for employment.

AMCS also works to improve the laws and regulations around water quality and water pollution in Queensland. Chemicals, sediment and fertilisers wash away into Great Barrier Reef waters and this has detrimental effects on corals and sea grass beds. In 2019, AMCS worked on tightening water pollution regulations in Queensland and new laws came into effect in December, 2019.

Whaling 
Ending whaling has been a key focus for the AMCS since the 1970s. AMCS worked on a global campaign in the 1980s that led to the world's first global ban on commercial whaling. In 1982 the International Whaling Commission (IWC) put a hold on commercial whaling of all whale species and populations. This moratorium came into effect in 1985 and is a ban that remains in place today.

Representatives from AMCS attend the IWC every two years and work with other NGOs such as International Fund for Animal Welfare and Humane Society International for anti-whaling, pro-conservation outcomes.

Despite a global ban on commercial whaling, Japan found a loophole and continued to hunt whales under the guise of "scientific purposes" in the Southern Ocean. Pressure from AMCS's advocacy work led to Australia taking Japan to court in 2013 over Japan's governments claims that its Antarctic whaling program was for "scientific purposes". The International Court of Justice issued a binding ruling in March 2014 that Japan's Antarctic whaling program broke international law and had to immediately stop. Japan did not hunt whales for a year after this ruling.

Key Achievements

Prevented mining on the Great Barrier Reef 
Known then as the Queensland Littoral Society, the AMCS contested and defeated a proposal to mine limestone on Australia’s Great Barrier Reef in the 1960s. The organisation then went on to lead the public campaign to protect the Reef from mining and oil exploration.

Global ban on commercial whaling 
AMCS helped spearhead this successful campaign in the 1980s, establishing a global ban on whaling. We remain vigilant on current threats to whales in Australia’s waters.

Since 2006, AMCS Director Darren Kindleysides has played a significant role to advocate international legal action against Japanese whaling. AMCS has been there from the inception of the plan to instigate international legal action against the Japanese whalers. Working with governments, lawyers and scientists we convinced Australia's leaders to take Japan to international courts, which ruled Japan’s whaling broke international law and must stop.

Sustainable Seafood revolution 
Launching a highly successful Australia’s Sustainable Seafood Guide for those who love the oceans and their seafood, AMCS revolutionised the way Australians view seafood and the fishing and fish farms that provide it. The guide is available in paperback, and as a dedicated consumer website and iPhone app which includes Greenpeace’s Canned Tuna Guide. More and more Australians are recognising their part in protecting our precious oceans by choosing their seafood responsibly.

Secured the Great Barrier Reef as a marine park 
AMCS led and built the campaign, which eventually involved numerous groups, and secured the Reef through the declaration of the Marine Park in 1974 and later recognised it as a World Heritage Area in 1982.

Working with conservation partners, AMCS secured the public support that led to full protection of 33.4% of the Reef in ‘green zones’ in 2004 and helped secure a profitable future for the Reef’s thriving ecotourism industry.

Historic Marine Parks and Sanctuary Zones 
AMCS has played a key role in campaigns that led to the Australian government proposing the largest network of marine reserves in the world in June 2012, including the proposal to create the world’s largest marine reserve in the Coral Sea. But now these reserves are under threat.

In collaboration with state based groups, AMCS secured marine parks across Victoria, in central NSW, across SA, parts of WA and Queensland. We’ve led campaigns to create a network of marine parks in the Northern Territory – with Limmen Bight, a haven for dugongs and other seagrass loving animals, declared as the NT’s first new marine reserve since the 1980s in July 2012.

Ningaloo Reef saved 
Along with Patron Tim Winton, AMCS and allies protected Ningaloo Reef, WA (Australia’s largest fringing coral reef) from a major marina development. With overwhelming support from the public, we further succeeded in securing 34% of the Ningaloo Marine Park in green zones, and most recently World Heritage listing in 2011.

Moreton Bay protected 
AMCS has a long track record of success in Moreton Bay includes stopping coral mining on Peel and Mud Island, banning sand mining on Moreton Island and advocating for its protection as a national park. More recently we worked with the community to increase the green zones from less than 1% to 16% protection in critical areas of coral, seagrass and rocky reefs.

Live shark finning banned in Australia 
Thanks to us, live shark finning at sea is now illegal in all Australian states and the Northern Territory. The NT was the last Australian jurisdiction which allowed this cruel and wasteful fishing method, and our community campaign resulted in its ban in 2004. We continue to work towards a ban on the export and import of shark fins in Australia, to stop Australia's involvement in this terrible trade.

Seacage fish farming stopped 
Through seeding and empowering a local community group, Friends of Sceale Bay, AMCS protected sea lion colonies in South Australia from unsustainable sea cage aquaculture development. We have also contested unsustainable sea cage proposals in NSW and Queensland. We are working with industry to lessen the impact of fish farms on our precious oceans.

Australia’s first seabed mining moratorium 
AMCS secured a three-year moratorium on seabed mining in Northern Territory waters in March 2012, the first Australian jurisdiction to stop this damaging activity. In May 2018, we secured an extension to this ban.

Marine Wildlife protected 
We have reduced the amount of sharks that can be fished in the East Coast Inshore Finfish Fishery, protected all seahorses and relatives (33 species) in NSW waters, secured (endangered) grey nurse shark critical habitats in Queensland and saved turtles from fishing nets and crab pots. We’ve also worked with our partners to stop fisheries killing dolphins and sea lions off South Australia.

Mangrove protection 
AMCS has helped government and industry value mangroves as critical nursery areas for fish and other wildlife. We have undertaken extensive littoral mangrove surveys that led to protection of important wetlands, including the World Heritage Kakadu National Park  in the NT and the Boondall Wetlands Reserve in Qld.

Stopped the Super Trawler 
Time and time again we have turned back supertrawlers like the Geelong Star that would have threatened our oceans and our livelihood. We have secured changes to federal environmental laws enabling new, untried and destructive fishing methods, including the operation of the MV Margiris super trawler in Australian waters to be scientifically assessed and excluded.

Stopped Port Developments in Fitzroy Delta 
We stopped proposed coal port developments near the mouth of the Fitzroy River south of Rockhampton and in the untouched region of Cape York in Far North Queensland. These fragile places are home to rare and unique sealife like snubfin dolphins and dugongs. Their homes were saved thanks to ocean lovers speaking out in their defence.

Notable Staff

Tooni Mahto 
Tooni Mahto is a marine biologist who worked at the BBC prior to moving to Australia.

Imogen Zethoven AO 
Imogen Zethoven was made an Officer of the Order of Australia for service to conservation and the environment.

Felicity "Flic" Wishart 
Felicity Wishart's last campaign was Fight for the Reef on behalf of the Australian Marine Conservation Society, where she fought against environmental threats to the Great Barrier Reef, in particular coal industry development in the Galilee Basin. In June 2017, the Great Barrier Reef Marine Park Authority announced that Reef No. 18-022 about 50 kilometres (31 mi) north-east of Hinchinbrook Island had been named Felicity Wishart Reef in her honour.

References

External links
Official Website
American Littoral Society
AMCS on Facebook
AMCS on Twitter
AMCS on Instagram

Environmental organisations based in Australia
1965 establishments in Australia
Marine conservation organizations